Rebekah Vardy (née Miranda, previously Nicholson; born 17 February 1982) is an English media personality married to the English football player Jamie Vardy. She was a contestant on I'm a Celebrity... Get Me Out of Here! in 2017 and on Dancing on Ice in 2021. In 2022, she lost a well-publicised libel case against Coleen Rooney, dubbed the "Wagatha Christie" trial. It was determined that Vardy did play a role in leaking fabricated stories about Rooney to The Sun, a British tabloid.

Personal life

Vardy was born in Norwich and in a variety of interviews, most recently in 2020 claimed she had been forced to grow up too soon after being abused as a child and made homeless at 15.

Her parents – Carlos and Alison – divorced when she was 11 and she moved from city to city, living in Norwich, Reading and Oxford as both moved on to new relationships.  At 17, she met electrician Mark Godden and later married him in Mexico.

In 2014, whilst working as a nightclub promoter, Vardy met the footballer Jamie Vardy. They married on 25 May 2016 at Peckforton Castle in Cheshire.

Vardy has five children from three different relationships: a daughter (born 2005); a son (born 2010), with footballer Luke Foster; and daughter (born 2014), son (born 2017) and daughter (born 2019) with current husband Jamie Vardy. She is also stepmother to Jamie's daughter from a previous relationship. Vardy's father, Carlos Miranda, was born in Madeira, making Vardy half-Portuguese.

Television
In November 2017, Vardy was a contestant on the seventeenth series of the ITV reality TV show I'm a Celebrity... Get Me Out of Here!. Vardy was the third celebrity to be eliminated on 4 December 2017. Vardy has made multiple appearances as a guest panellist and presenter on Loose Women. She has also appeared on Good Morning Britain, Jeremy Vine and This Morning. In 2019, Vardy appeared in two episodes of Celebrity Gogglebox alongside husband Jamie, and an episode of How To Spend it Well at Christmas in 2019 alongside her family. In September 2020, it was announced that she would be competing in the thirteenth series of Dancing on Ice in 2021. She was partnered with Andy Buchanan and was eliminated in week 6.

Charity work
Rebekah and Jamie Vardy are both Family ambassadors to Barnardo's. Vardy is also a patron of The Dorothy Goodman School in Leicestershire. She has supported Leicester based homeless charity 'Homelessness to Hope' having officially opened The Hope Centre  and has supported the Jeans for Genes charity campaign. Vardy supported the family of Alfie Evans, an infant boy from Liverpool with a then-undiagnosed neurodegenerative disorder, in their campaign to have him sent abroad for further treatment.

Libel trial against Coleen Rooney

On 9 October 2019, Coleen Rooney, the wife of another footballer, Wayne Rooney, made a Twitter post alleging that posts from her private Instagram account were being leaked to the newspaper The Sun. Rooney said that, to catch who was selling the stories, she had restricted access on who could see the posts. She stated that the only viewer of these posts was Vardy's account. This Tweet went viral, being dubbed the 'Wagatha Christie', a portmanteau of the football term WAG and mystery writer Agatha Christie. Vardy responded on her own Twitter account, denying the claims and stating that her Instagram had been hacked. 

In June 2020, Vardy sued Rooney for defamation. Although Vardy won a preliminary stage in the case in November 2020, in July 2022, following the full trial, the judge ruled against Vardy and determined that Rooney's claims were "substantially true". The judge described Vardy as "an untrustworthy witness" and found that she probably worked with her agent to leak stories about Rooney to the press. Vardy said she was sad and disappointed with the decision, but stated she would not appeal. In October 2022, Vardy was ordered by the court to pay 90% of Rooney's legal costs, which was reported to be a higher proportion than is usual in such cases. The judge made this decision partly because Vardy had been found to have destroyed relevant evidence prior to the trial. As a result, Vardy was ordered to make an immediate payment to Rooney of £800,000 with the remainder to be assessed with the maximum amount set at £1.5m. Vardy's own legal costs were estimated to have been a similar figure, resulting in the total cost for Vardy of the litigation she commenced but lost being potentially around £3m.

References

External links
 

1982 births
Living people
English female models
English people of Portuguese descent
Association footballers' wives and girlfriends
English television personalities
I'm a Celebrity...Get Me Out of Here! (British TV series) participants
Media personalities from Norwich